Metro Council can refer to:
Louisville Metro Council in Louisville, Kentucky
Metropolitan Council in the Minneapolis-St. Paul metropolitan area, Minnesota
Metropolitan Council (Davidson County) in Nashville and Davidson County, Tennessee
Metropolitan Toronto Council in Toronto, Ontario, Canada
The governing body of Metro (Oregon regional government) in the Portland area